Liberty Hill may refer to:

Places
Ireland
Liberty Hill, Cortober, County Roscommon, Ireland

United States
(by state)
Houston, Georgia, also called Liberty Hill
Liberty Hill (La Grange, Georgia), NRHP-listed
Liberty Hill, Cincinnati, Ohio
Liberty Hill, Pittsburgh, Pennsylvania
Liberty Hill, South Carolina
Liberty Hill Historic District, Liberty Hill, South Carolina, listed on the NRHP in Kershaw County, South Carolina
Liberty Hill, Tennessee (disambiguation), multiple places
Liberty Hill, Texas
Liberty Hill, West Virginia

See also
Liberty Hill School (disambiguation)
Liberty Hills (disambiguation)